Sir Robert Cotton, 1st Baronet (c. 1635 – 18 December 1712) was an English politician. He was Member of Parliament (MP) for Cheshire from 1679 to 1681 and from 1689 to 1702.

He was the eldest surviving son of Thomas Cotton of Combermere Abbey, Cheshire, and his wife Elizabeth Calveley, daughter of Sir George Calveley of Lea (aka Calverley). His ancestor Sir George Cotton was granted Combermere by Henry VIII in about 1541.

In 1677 he was made Baronet of Combermere in the County Palatine of Chester.

After he was accused of treasonable correspondence with the Electress of Hanover, Sophia, in 1685 he was committed to the Tower of London by the Earl of Sunderland, Secretary of State for the Southern Department. He was eventually cleared of the charges in part by the testimony of some of his political opponents.

In politics he was a staunch Whig and opponent of James II. He welcomed the Glorious Revolution but did not play a leading role in politics thereafter. Historians consider his voting pattern to be proto-"Country", which irked some of the less independent Whigs of his era. He was considered a principled and honest man.

Family
He 1684 he married Hester Salusbury, daughter and sole heir of the Royalist politician and soldier Sir Thomas Salusbury and his wife Hester Tyrrell. As a result, the family's seat at Combermere Abbey was enhanced with the Llewenni Estate in Denbighshire, northeast Wales. The couple had the following known issue, (out of a possible sixteen children in all):

Hugh-Calveley Cotton, who married Mary, only daughter and heiress of Sir William Russell, 1st Baronet of Langherne and his wife Hester Rouse. 
Hugh-Calveley died before his father and left an only daughter, Catherine, who married Thomas Lewis, Esq. of St Pierre, Monmouthshire. 
Sir Thomas Cotton, 2nd Baronet, of Combermere
Mary Cotton, who married Sir William Fowler, of Harnage Grange.
Anne Cotton, who married Sir Thomas Taylor, 1st Baronet; she was the grandmother of the 1st Earl of Bective
Arabella Cotton, who married Henry Tichborne, 1st Baron Ferrard and had issue.

Ancestry

References 

Bibliography

ThePeerage.com

 

1630s births
1712 deaths
Cotton, Sir Robert, 1st Baronet
English MPs 1680–1681
English MPs 1681
English MPs 1689–1690
English MPs 1690–1695
English MPs 1695–1698
English MPs 1698–1700
English MPs 1701
English MPs 1701–1702